The Cuban Revolutionary Party – Authentic (PRC-A), commonly called the Authentic Party (PA), was a political party in Cuba most active between 1933 and 1952. Although the Partido Auténtico had significant influence, it eventually became unpopular due to corruption scandals and, despite significant reforms, Fulgencio Batista returned to power after a coup d’etat.

History
The Partido Auténtico had its origins in the nationalist Revolution of 1933. It was made up in February 1934 by many of the same individuals who had brought about the downfall of Gerardo Machado in the previous year to defend the changes caused by the Revolution of 1933.

In the 1939 Constitutional Assembly election the party was part of the victorious Opposition Front, and it emerged as the largest party in the Assembly. The 1940 Constitution of Cuba was heavily influenced by the nationalist ideas at the heart of the party's program.

Although the party also held the most seats in the Chamber of Representatives after the 1940 general election, its candidate, Ramón Grau, lost the presidential election. In the 1942 parliamentary election it finished third, winning only 10 seats. Grau went on to win the presidency at the 1944 general election, which also saw the Partido Auténtico win the most seats in the Chamber. The party also won the 1946 mid-term election with 30 seats.

For the 1948 general election the party formed an alliance with the Republican Party, helping Carlos Prío Socarrás win the presidency, and also winning both the Chamber and Senate. A different alliance with the Democratic Party and the Liberal Party was formed for the 1950 mid-term election, and this alliance too won. However, the Partido Auténtico lost the 1954 general election to Fulgencio Batista's National Progressive Coalition.

Ideology

The Partido Auténtico was the most nationalistic of the major parties that existed between the Revolution of 1933 and the 1959 Cuban Revolution. It had as its slogan Cuba para los cubanos ("Cuba for Cubans").

Its electoral program contained corporatist elements. For instance, it supported numerous efforts to strengthen the power of the labor unions, some of the party's biggest supporters. Also, some of its members supported the management of the economy through tripartite commissions with businessmen, labor leaders and government bureaucrats, as well as a second chamber (River Plate) with labor and business groups.

Notable members
Ramón Grau
Carlos Prío Socarrás
Nicolás Castellanos
Manuel Antonio de Varona
Carlos Manuel de Céspedes y Quesada
Eduardo Chibás
Carlos Hevia
Félix Lancís Sánchez
Raúl López del Castillo
Antonio Guiteras
Gilberto Goliath
Manuel Penabaz Solorzano
 Manuel Aran

Electoral results

References

Azcuy Y Cruz, A (1950) En Defensa Del Autenticismo, La Habana, P Fernandez Y Cia
Ameringer, CD (2000) The Cuban Democratic Experience: The Autentico Years 1944-1952, University Press of Florida 
de la Fuente, A (2001) A Nation for All: Race, Inequality, and Politics in Twentieth-century Cuba

External links

Party website

Cuban nationalism
Defunct political parties in Cuba
Left-wing nationalist parties
Left-wing populism in South America
Political parties established in 1934
Syndicalist political parties
1934 establishments in Cuba